Good Hope (also known as Goodhope or Norco-goodhope) was a census-designated place (CDP) in St. Charles Parish, Louisiana, United States, located on the east bank of the Mississippi River.

It was located between the towns of New Sarpy and Norco before being annexed by Norco on September 5, 2000. The town has a total population of zero.

History
The annexation by Norco was the eventual result of a 1983 buyout of all residential and commercial property by the Good Hope Refinery.

Notable people
David Butler, sculptor and artist

See also
List of ghost towns in Louisiana

References

Former census-designated places in Louisiana
Ghost towns in St. Charles Parish, Louisiana
Populated places disestablished in 2000
2000 disestablishments in Louisiana